Associated Grocers of Florida, Inc. is a retailers' cooperative based in Pompano Beach that distributes full lines of groceries and general merchandise. Founded in 1945, it provides retail services to independent Supermarkets.

Associated Grocers of Florida is a wholesale distributor and exporter of groceries, meat, produce, dairy, ice cream, frozen food, general merchandise, health and beauty care, and store supplies to supermarkets throughout Florida, Central America, South America, and Caribbean countries.

Store Brands include IGA, Shurfine, Shurfresh, Paws Premium Pet Care, Valutime, Top Care, Food Club, and Full Circle.

Associated Grocers of Florida was acquired by SuperValu in 2017.

References

External links
 Associated Grocers of Florida website

Wholesalers of the United States
Distribution companies of the United States
Retailers' cooperatives in the United States
American companies established in 1945
Retail companies established in 1945
Organizations established in 1945
American companies disestablished in 2017
Retail companies disestablished in 2017
Organizations disestablished in 2017
Companies based in Broward County, Florida
Pompano Beach, Florida
1945 establishments in Florida
2017 disestablishments in Florida